Godfrey Wentworth was one of two Members of the Parliament of England for the constituency of York from 1741–1742 and again from 1742–1747.

Life and politics
Godfrey belonged to a branch of the Wentworth Woodhouse family. He was educated at Wakefield School before graduating from St John's College, Cambridge in 1722. He married his first cousin, Dorothy Pilkington in 1728. The marriage was dissolved in 1758. Dorothy was the daughter of Sir Lyon Pilkington, 4th Baronet of Stanley. They had a daughter, Anna Maria, who eventually married Sir George Armytage, 3rd Baronet. 

Godfrey had been a long serving Alderman in the city of York before becoming an MP for the city. He was also Lord mayor of York in 1759. Being a long term officer of the city corporation, his election in 1741 was designed to bring back some Tory balance to the seat and Parliament. He was noted for supporting moves to prevent electoral corruption.

He died on 18 January 1789.

References

Lord Mayors of York
Members of the Parliament of England for constituencies in Yorkshire
British MPs 1741–1747

1704 births
1789 deaths